The Zemgale Olympic Center is a multi-sports complex located in Jelgava, Latvia. It contains many facilities including an athletics field and football stadium, which serves as the home of FK Jelgava and BK Jelgava. The capacity of the football stadium is 1,560.

References

External links
Official site

Football venues in Latvia
Athletics (track and field) venues in Latvia
Multi-purpose stadiums in Latvia
Badminton venues